Dragan Marjanac (born 26 February 1985) is a Serbian handball player for Swiss club HSC Suhr Aarau.

Club career
After playing for Vojvodina and Partizan, Marjanac went abroad and spent three seasons with Pick Szeged (2007–2010). He then briefly played for Toledo and Bosna Sarajevo. In 2011, Marjanac moved to Switzerland and joined BSV Bern. He spent seven seasons with the club before switching to HSC Suhr Aarau.

International career
At youth level, Marjanac represented Serbia and Montenegro at the 2005 World Under-21 Championship, as the team finished as runners-up.

A full Serbia international since its inception, Marjanac represented the nation in five major tournaments, winning the silver medal at the 2012 European Championship.

Honours
Pick Szeged
 Magyar Kupa: 2007–08

References

External links
 MKSZ record
 Olympic record
 
 

1985 births
Living people
People from Vrbas, Serbia
Serbian male handball players
Competitors at the 2009 Mediterranean Games
Mediterranean Games medalists in handball
Mediterranean Games gold medalists for Serbia
Olympic handball players of Serbia
Handball players at the 2012 Summer Olympics
RK Crvenka players
RK Crvena zvezda players
RK Vojvodina players
RK Partizan players
SC Pick Szeged players
Liga ASOBAL players
Expatriate handball players
Serbian expatriate sportspeople in Hungary
Serbian expatriate sportspeople in Spain
Serbian expatriate sportspeople in Bosnia and Herzegovina
Serbian expatriate sportspeople in Switzerland